Ošljak may refer to:

 Ošljak (mountain), a mountain in Serbia
 Ošljak (island), an inhabited island in Croatia